The Wild Westerners is a 1962 American Western film directed by Oscar Rudolph and starring James Philbrook, Nancy Kovack, Duane Eddy and Guy Mitchell.

Plot
A U.S. marshal investigates when a sheriff named Plummer is suspected of involvement in a string of robberies. It becomes personal when the marshal's wife is taken captive by the outlaws.

Cast
 James Philbrook as Marshal Jim McDowell
 Nancy Kovack as Rose Sharon
 Duane Eddy as Deputy Marshal Clint Fallon
 Guy Mitchell as Deputy Johnny Silver
 Hugh Sanders as Chief Marshal Reuben Bernard 
 Elizabeth MacRae as Crystal Plummer
 Marshall Reed as Sheriff Plummer
 Nestor Paiva as Governor John Bullard 
 Harry Lauter as Jud Gotch
 Bob Steele as Deputy Marshal Casey Bannen
 Lisa Burkett as Yellow Moon
 Terry Frost as Ashley Cartwright 
 Hans Wedemeyer as Wasna
 Don Harvey as Hanna
 Elizabeth Harrower as Martha Bernard

Soundtrack
The Wild Westerners
Written by Duane Eddy and Lee Hazlewood
Performed by Duane Eddy

Eddy's song was released with the flip side being The Ballad of Paladin from Have Gun, Will Travel.

See also
 List of American films of 1962

References

External links
 

1962 films
American Western (genre) films
1960s English-language films
1962 Western (genre) films
Columbia Pictures films
1960s American films